Weinrib is a surname meaning "wine" in Yiddish. It may refer to:

David Weinrib (1924–2016), American sculptor and artist of ceramic art
Eric Weinrib, award-winning, American filmmaker and TV producer
Geddy Lee Weinrib known as Geddy Lee, Canadian musician, singer and songwriter, lead vocalist, bassist, and keyboardist for the Canadian rock group Rush
Lennie Weinrib (1935–2006), also known as Lenny, Leonard and Len Weinrib, American actor, voice actor and writer

See also
Weinreb

References

Jewish surnames